Lac Blanc or Blanc Lake may refer to:

Blanc Lake (Saint-Ubalde) , a lake in Saint-Ubalde, Quebec, Canada
Lac Blanc (Chamonix), a lake in Haute-Savoie, France
Lac Blanc (Vosges), a lake in Haut-Rhin, France
Lac-Blanc, Quebec, an unorganized territory in Quebec, in Canada

See also
White Lake (disambiguation)